Local nature reserves (LNRs) are designated by local authorities under the National Parks and Access to the Countryside Act 1949. The local authority must have a legal control over the site, by owning or leasing it or having an agreement with the owner. LNRs are sites which have a special local interest either biologically or geologically, and local authorities have a duty to care for them. They can apply local bye-laws to manage and protect LNRs.

As of March 2019, there are twenty-seven LNRs in West Sussex. Nine are Sites of Special Scientific Interest, six are Nature Conservation Review sites, four are Ramsar sites, two are Special Areas of Conservation, four are Special Protection Areas, one includes a scheduled monument and two are managed by the Sussex Wildlife Trust.

West Sussex is in south-east England and it has a population of approximately 780,000. The county town is Chichester. In the north of the county are the heavy clays and sands of the Weald. The chalk of the South Downs runs across the centre from east to west and in the south a coastal plain runs down to the English Channel.

Key

Public access
No = no public access to site
PP = public access to part of site
Yes = public access to all or most of the site

Other classifications
NCR = Nature Conservation Review site
Ramsar = Ramsar site, an internationally important wetland site
SAC = Special Area of Conservation
SM = Scheduled monument
SPA = Special Protection Area under the European Union Directive on the Conservation of Wild Birds
 SSSI = Site of Special Scientific Interest
SWT = Sussex Wildlife Trust

Sites

See also
List of Sites of Special Scientific Interest in West Sussex
Sussex Wildlife Trust

Notes

References

Sources

 
West Sussex
Local Nature Reserves